Latin America contains approximately 17.5% of the world's Quakers.  Latin American Friends are concentrated in Bolivia and Central America. Most of these Friends are evangelical and are affiliated with Evangelical Friends Church International.  Friends World Committee for Consultation organizes among them through the Comité de Amigos Latinoamericanos CoAL del Comité Mundial de Consulta de Los Amigos CMCA FWCC.

Bolivia and southern South America 
There are about 30,000 Friends in Bolivia. Quakerism came to Bolivia in 1919 through a Navajo man, William Abel, who sold Bibles and preached in the capital city of La Paz.  Bolivian Juan Ayllón became convinced of the truth of the preacher's message and went to study at the Friends' Biblical Institute in Guatemala.  After graduating in 1924 he returned and began the Evangelical Friends Church.  This yearly meeting, now INELA-BOLIVIA, Iglesia Nacional Evangélica de Los Amigos, consists of 192 congregations throughout Bolivia and sponsors several schools.

Also during 1919 the Holiness Friends Mission, an association of independent Indiana Friends, established meetings in Bolivia's northern Andes surrounding Sorata village.  When the mission reorganized as Central Friends Mission in 1952 the Bolivian meetings divided into two Yearly Meetings—  (Bolivian Friends YM), and Holiness Friends.
At first, Bolivian Yearly Meetings consisted only of members of Aymara heritage.  Aymara Friends are now working among Quechua, Moseten, Chimane, and other indigenous groups.  Yearly Meetings include Iglesia Evangélica Amigos Central (semi-programmed congregations in the Friends Church related to Central YM), Iglesia Evangélica Unión Boliviana "Amigos" (Bolivian Union Evangelical Friends Church), Iglesia Nacional Evangélica Los Amigos de Bolivia (National Evangelical Friends Church of Bolivia) or INELA-Bolivia, and Iglesia Evangélica Misión Boliviana de Santidad Amigos (Bolivian Evangelical Mission of Holiness Friends Church).

In Peru there are about 5,000 Friends; they are a part of INELA-Perú Iglesia Nacional Evangélica Los Amigos del Perú (National Evangelical Friends Church of Peru), an outgrowth of INELA-Bolivia.  This church has grown through extensive youth outreach.  Bolivian Friends are also supporting missions in northwest Argentina, especially among indigenous people there.

Two other small Friends groups exist in Bolivia:  Iglesia Nacional Evangélica 'Estrella de Belén, Iglesia Nacional Evangélica 'Seminario Bíblico are beginning to cooperate with the other Yearly Meetings.

Central America and other Latin American countries
There are approximately 20,000 Friends in the nation of Guatemala. Missions from California and Oregon YM early in the 20th century led to the founding of Central America Yearly Meeting, with headquarters at Chiquimula. There is also Guatemala Monthly Meeting, a small unprogrammed meeting affiliated with Pacific Yearly Meeting (meetings alternating between Guatemala capital and Guatemala Antigua), which operates PROGRESA (formerly Guatemala Friends Scholarship Program), an educational program at the high school and university level serving primarily highlands indigenous communities. (This last was laid down in 2018.)

Honduras Yearly Meeting of the Friends Church was formed from the eastern missions of CA YM. Tegucigalpa Friends Church has returned to the YM.

They have a number of congregations and YM offices in Soyopango, a suburb of San Salvador. Recently the YM has taken on the project of promoting "Proyecto Alternativas a la Violencia" PAV (AVP - the Alternatives to Violence Project)

There are also about 72 Friends in Costa Rica.  Monteverde Monthly Meeting was founded as a colony by a group of young Conservative Friends families in 1952, trying to find a place that was not militaristic.  Many of the men in the group had been incarcerated in the United States as conscientious objectors and they were attracted when Costa Rica abolished its army.  El Centro de Los Amigos para la Paz, with a small hostel, was founded as a community center and a home for San José Quakers' unprogrammed silent worship in the 1980s.

Mexico has about 800 Friends in two meetings—the Asociación Religiosa de las Iglesias Evangélicas de los Amigos (the yearly meeting of the Religious Association of the Friends Evangelical Churches EFCI) and the Reunion General de los Amigos en México (General Meeting of Friends in Mexico), which meets sesquiannually (every 18 months), comprising several churches around Ciudad Victoria monthly meeting (founded by missions from FUM), and Mexico City Monthly Meeting, affiliated with Pacific Yearly Meeting, an open worship, liberal meeting in the Mexican capital. They manage the Casa de Los Amigos in Mexico DF, which has numerous programs, including refugee support. There are similar groups in Sonora as well.

There are about 373 Friends in Cuba. They are members of Cuba Yearly Meeting (""), which is affiliated with Friends United Meeting. The first MMs in Banes and Gibara were begun in 1904.  All but one of the 11 monthly meetings are in former Oriente province, around Holguín. Also in Cuba there was a small unprogrammed group in Havana starting in 1994, which spread silent worship across the Island; there were unprogrammed groups in Holguin for two years, one in Santiago de Cuba and in Santi Spiritus for a while, but all have been laid down.  Looking at their missionary heritage and developing their Quaker roots while seeking to develop a Cuban Quakerism in the rapidly changing national environment, the YM founded the Cuban Quaker Peace Institute, "Instituto Cuáquero Cubano de Paz" in Gibara in 2013, with courses promoting the Quaker Testimonies and peace-building.

After the Conference of Friends in the Americas in 1977, Latino Friends got to know each other and FWCC began an effort to help them organize.  This led to the founding of CoAL in Mexico City in 1982.  EFCI also began trying to bring all the Evangelical mission church YMs of the region into a region of their denomination, as well as other programmed Quakers.  Today pastoral and Evangelical Friends in Latin America are in regular contact, but they are only slowly constructing links to one another.

There have been unprogrammed worship meetings and groups in Latin America for several years, the oldest and most permanent in Costa Rica and Mexico; the majority of the others are expatriates' worship groups plus about 20 in Colombia, Bogotá Monthly Meeting.  Unprogrammed Friends in Latin America had their first meeting in November 2006 in Monteverde, Costa Rica.

References

External links
Statistics by country
List of Yearly Meetings in the Americas

Latin America
Protestantism in South America
Protestantism in Central America
Protestantism in Bolivia
Protestantism in Cuba
Protestantism in Peru
Protestantism in Mexico
Protestantism in El Salvador
Protestantism in Costa Rica
Protestantism in Colombia